Binga may refer to:

Binga District, Zimbabwe
Binga village, Zimbabwe
Binga, Mali
Binga, Democratic Republic of the Congo
Binga people, an ethnic group in Sudan
Jesse Binga, American businessman
Monte Binga, highest mountain in Mozambique
Brett Lee (born 1976), Australian cricketer, nicknamed Binga